Winston Bryan "Bing" Juckes (born June 14, 1926 in Hamiota, Manitoba - d. December 31, 1990) was a professional ice hockey player who played 16 games in the National Hockey League.  He played with the New York Rangers.

References 

1926 births
1990 deaths
Canadian ice hockey left wingers
Ice hockey people from Manitoba
New York Rangers players